The Philippine Air Force Air Spikers (also known as the Philippine Air Force Aguilas) is the official men's volleyball team of the Philippine Air Force. The team is composed of enlisted personnel and reinforced with civilian players.

Current roster 

Coaching staff
 Head coach:Rhovyl Verayo
 Assistant coach:Clarence Esteban

Team staff
 Team manager:
 Team utility:

Medical staff
 Team physician:
 Physical therapist:

Previous roster 

Coaching staff
 Head Coach: Rhovyl Verayo
 Assistant Coach: Clarence Esteban

Team Staff
 Team Manager:
 Team Utility:

Medical Staff
 Team Physician:
 Physical Therapist:

Coaching staff
 Head Coach: Rhovyl Verayo
 Assistant Coach: Dante Alinsunurin

Team Staff
 Team Manager:
 Team Utility:

Medical Staff
 Team Physician:
 Physical Therapist:

Coaching staff
 Head Coach: Rhovyl Verayo
 Assistant Coach: Clarence Esteban

Team Staff
 Team Manager: 
 Team Utility: 

Medical Staff
 Team Physician:
 Physical Therapist:

Coaching staff
 Head Coach: Rhovyl Verayo
 Assistant Coach: Clarence Esteban

Team Staff
 Team Manager: 
 Team Utility: 

Medical Staff
 Team Physician:
 Physical Therapist:

Honors

Team 
2021 PNVF Champions League

Spikers' Turf / Premier Volleyball League

Individual

Team Captains 
  Jessie Lopez (2015, 2017, 2018, 2019)
  Mark Carlo Pangan (2016)
  Jeffrey Malabanan (2016)
  Pitrus De Ocampo (2019)

Coaches 
  Rhovyl Verayo (2015 – present)

See also 
 Philippine Air Force Women's Volleyball Team

References 

Premier Volleyball League (Philippines)
Men's volleyball teams in the Philippines
Sports teams in Metro Manila
Military sports clubs in the Philippines